The Bell of Yongjusa is located in the temple of Yongjusa, near Suwon, Gyeonggi Province, South Korea.

History
The bronze bell was cast and installed in the temple in 854. The temple was destroyed in 1636 during the Second Manchu invasion of Korea but the bell survived. The temple was rebuilt in 1790 and the bell reinstalled.

The bell is listed at number 120 in the "National Treasures of South Korea" list.

See also
 Culture of Korea
 Korean Art
 Bell of King Seongdeok
 Bell of Cheonheungsa
 Bell of Sangwonsa

References

Individual bells
Korean art
National Treasures of South Korea